Wellington railway station is the railway station that serves the town of Wellington in the Western Cape province of South Africa. It is the terminus of the Metrorail Northern Line service from Cape Town Station, except for a single train daily in each direction as far as Worcester. Wellington is also a stop for Shosholoza Meyl inter-city trains that originate or terminate in Cape Town.

The station has two tracks for passenger trains; one is a terminal track facing towards Cape Town and the other is a through track. They are accessed by a single platform attached to the station building, which lies on the western side of the tracks.

Services

Shosholoza Meyl stations
Metrorail Western Cape stations
Railway stations in the Western Cape